Johan Claesson (born August 12, 1981, in Uppsala) is a retired Swedish footballer who last played for IK Sirius in the Swedish Division 1 Norra.

Career

Sweden
Claesson began his career as part of the youth team at Hagby IK, before moving to IK Sirius, where he played until 2005.

Claesson moved to Gefle IF in 2005, and spent four years with the team. Initially used as a substitute, he eventually won a first team spot, and went on to make almost 100 appearances for the club in the Allsvenskan, scoring three goals.

United States
In December 2008 Claesson signed a one-year contract with the Portland Timbers of the USL First Division with the option of a second year. He played 23 games and scored 1 goal in his debut season with the Timbers, and proved to be an important part of the team's midfield, helping them to the 2009 USL-1 regular season title.

Comeback in IK Sirius

In December 2010 Claesson signed for his old club IK Sirius in the Swedish third tier.

Honors

Portland Timbers
USL First Division Commissioner's Cup (1): 2009

References

External links
 Portland Timbers bio

1981 births
Living people
Swedish footballers
Association football midfielders
Gefle IF players
Portland Timbers (2001–2010) players
USL First Division players
USSF Division 2 Professional League players
Expatriate soccer players in the United States
Swedish expatriate sportspeople in the United States
Swedish expatriate footballers
IK Sirius Fotboll players
Footballers from Uppsala